The 2014 IIHF Inline Hockey World Championship was the 19th IIHF Inline Hockey World Championship, an international inline hockey tournament run by the International Ice Hockey Federation. The World Championship ran alongside the 2014 IIHF Inline Hockey World Championship Division I tournament and took place between 1 and 7 June 2014 in Pardubice, Czech Republic. The tournament was won by the Finland, earning their fourth World Championship title. Canada finished in second place and the United States in third after defeating Sweden in the bronze medal match. Great Britain, after losing the relegation game against Slovakia was relegated to Division I for 2015.

Qualification
Seven of the eight teams automatically qualified for the 2014 IIHF Inline Hockey World Championship while the eighth spot was awarded to the winner of the 2013 IIHF Inline Hockey World Championship Division I tournament. The 2013 Division I tournament was won by Great Britain who defeated Austria in the final to earn promotion back to the World Championship after they were relegated in 2012.

 − Finished third in the 2013 World Championship
 − Finished fifth in the 2013 World Championship
 − Finished seventh in the 2013 World Championship
 − Finished sixth in the 2013 World Championship
 − Winner of 2013 IIHF Inline Hockey World Championship Division I
 − Finished fourth in the 2013 World Championship
 − Finished second in the 2013 World Championship
 − Finished first in the 2013 World Championship

Seeding and groups
The seeding in the preliminary round was based on the final standings at the 2013 IIHF Inline Hockey World Championship and 2013 IIHF Inline Hockey World Championship Division I. The World Championships groups are named Group A and Group B while the 2014 IIHF Inline Hockey World Championship Division I tournament use Group C and Group D, as both tournaments were held in Pardubice, Czech Republic. The teams were grouped accordingly by seeding at the previous year's tournament (in parenthesis is the corresponding seeding):

Group C
 (1)
 (4)
 (5)
 (8)

Group D
 (2)
 (3)
 (6)
 (7)

Preliminary round
Eight participating teams were placed in the following two groups. After playing a round-robin, every team advanced to the Playoff round.

All times are local (UTC+2).

Group A

Group B

Playoff round
All eight teams advanced into the playoff round and were seeded into the quarterfinals according to their result in the preliminary round. The winning quarterfinalists advanced through to the semifinals, while the losing teams moved through to the placement round. Great Britain was relegated after losing the relegation game against Slovakia, while the Czech Republic finished fifth after defeating Great Britain and Germany finished sixth following their win over Slovakia in their placement round games. In the semifinals Finland defeated Sweden and Canada beat the United States, both advancing to the gold medal game. After losing the semifinals Sweden and the United States played off for the bronze medal with the United States winning 12–5. Finland defeated Canada 6–2 in the gold medal game, earning their fourth World Championship title.

All times are local (UTC+2).

Quarterfinals

Placement round

Relegation game

Semifinals

Bronze medal game

Gold medal game

Ranking and statistics

Tournament Awards
Best players selected by the directorate:
Best Goalkeeper:  Brett Leggat
Best Defenseman:  Sami Markkanen
Best Forward:  Matt White

Final standings
The final standings of the tournament according to IIHF:

Scoring leaders

List shows the top skaters sorted by points, then goals. If the list exceeds 10 skaters because of a tie in points, all of the tied skaters are shown.

Leading goaltenders

Only the top five goaltenders, based on save percentage, who have played at least 40% of their team's minutes are included in this list.

References

External links
World Championship at IIHF.com

IIHF Inline Hockey World Championship
2014 in inline hockey
IIHF InLine Hockey World Championship
IIHF InLine Hockey World Championship
Sports competitions in Pardubice
Inline hockey in the Czech Republic